Sun Yi (born 4 June 1993) is a Chinese actress.

Career
In 2014, Sun was picked from 1000 candidates to star in the art-house film Pleasure. Love.. The film premiered at the 2016 Sundance Film Festival in the World Dramatic competition. Sun won the Best Actress at the Asian New Talent Awards. She also won Best New Actress at the 11th Chinese Young Generation Film Forum.

In 2015, she starred in romantic comedy film My Original Dream which was screened in competition at the 28th Tokyo International Film Festival. The same year, she featured in the historical drama The Legend of Mi Yue.

Sun raised her profile after starring in the youth melodrama Promise of Migratory Birds. She gained widespread popularity with her role in Because of Meeting You, adapted from the 2014 Korean drama Jang Bo-ri is Here! alongside Deng Lun.  The series placed number one throughout its broadcast and averaged ratings of 1.93%, becoming one of the highest rated drama of the year.

In 2018, Sun starred in the period romance drama Siege in Fog, and romance melodrama All Out of Love.  
The same year, she was cast in the romance drama Irreplaceable Love. 

In 2019, Sun was cast in the legal romance drama Hello Prosecutor, a remake of the South Korean television series Prosecutor Princess. 

In 2020, she was cast in the historical romance drama Twisted Fate of Love.

Personal life
On May 7, Sun and actor Dong Zijian announced they were getting married. The couple later welcomed a baby girl named Dong Dafu in September 2017.

Filmography

Film

Television series

Discography

Awards and nominations

References

Chinese film actresses
Chinese television actresses
21st-century Chinese actresses
1993 births
Living people
Actresses from Jilin